The Timor-Leste national futsal team is controlled by the Federação de Futebol de Timor-Leste, the governing body for futsal in East Timor (Timor-Leste) and represents the country in international futsal competitions.

Competitions History

FIFA Futsal World Cup

AFC Futsal Championship

AFF Futsal Championship

Squad

Current squad 
The following players were called up for the 2015 AFF Futsal Championship in Thailand during 8 – 16 October 2015.

Caps and goals updated as of 12 October 2015, after the match against Thailand.

International match records

Results and fixtures

2022

List of Coaches

References

External links

Asian national futsal teams
National sports teams of East Timor
Futsal in East Timor